Baldur's Gate may refer to:

 Baldur's Gate, a city in the Forgotten Realms campaign setting for Dungeons & Dragons
Baldur's Gate, a video game series set in the Forgotten Realms
 Baldur's Gate (video game), the first game released in 1998
 Baldur's Gate (novel), the novelization of the first video game in the series by Philip Athans
 Baldur's Gate, a 1970 novel by Eleanor Clark set in Jordan Village, Connecticut, that features a sculptor named Baldur